Crowdecote (sometimes spelled Crowdicote) is a small village in Derbyshire, England. Crowdecote is within the civil parish of Hartington Middle Quarter. It is thought that the name Crowdecote derives from Cruda’s Cot (Cruda was a Saxon landowner while 'cot' meant a form of shelter). Crowdecote is popular with walkers and ramblers because of its proximity to Chrome Hill, High Wheeldon and Parkhouse Hill to the north and Dovedale to the south.

See also
Listed buildings in Hartington Middle Quarter

References

External links

Villages in Derbyshire
Towns and villages of the Peak District
Derbyshire Dales